The Communist Party of Luxembourg (abbr. KPL or PCL) is a communist party in Luxembourg.  is the current chairman of the party.

History 
 
The KPL was founded on 2 January 1921, in the town of Niederkorn, making it one of the oldest parties in Luxembourg. In 1937, the Bech government attempted to introduce the so-called Maulkuerfgesetz ("Muzzle law") which would have banned the party. The law was abandoned after failing to achieve popular support in a national referendum.

Following the end of the Second World War, the party, which won 11.1% in the legislative elections, joined the National Union Government (1945–47). Its first minister was Charles Marx. After Marx's death in a 1946 car accident, he was replaced by Dominique Urbany. After the death of the leader of the LSAP, the coalition collapsed. With the principle of an all-inclusive government gone, the KPL was excluded from the next government and never returned another member to the cabinet.

In 1964, the United States State Department estimated the party membership to be approximately 500. In legislative elections held in the same year, the party registered 10.4% of the vote, and won five of the Chamber of Deputies' 56 seats. The party's representation in the Chamber peaked at the following election, with six deputies, but fell, until the KPL lost its last remaining deputy in 1994. In the same year a minority opposing the Marxist-Leninist line of the party split and founded the New Left ( together with the rest of the Revolutionary Socialist Party.

In 1999, the KPL and the New Left agreed to found The Left. The Left had members of both parties and independents. Accordingly, KPL members ran on The Left lists in the 1999 and 2000 elections and no separate KPL lists existed. After disputes between a majority within the Left and leading KPL members shortly before the 2004 elections the party again ran separate lists. A number of the Left members were subsequently expelled from the KPL.

The KPL is represented locally on the councils of Differdange and Rumelange. In Rumelange, it is part of the ruling coalition together with the LSAP.

Election results

Footnotes

References 
 Ruckert, Ali, Geschichte der Kommunistischen Partei Luxemburgs, Teil I: 1921-1946, Esch-sur-Alzette 2006
 Ruckert, Ali, Geschichte der Kommunistischen Partei Luxemburgs, Teil II: 1947-1954, Esch-sur-Alzette 2007
 Ruckert, Ali, Geschichte der Kommunistischen Partei Luxemburgs, Teil III: 1955-1960, Esch-sur-Alzette 2010
 Wehenkel, Henri, Communisme et postcommunisme au Luxembourg, in: Communisme 2014, 1989-2014 - L'éternel retour des communistes, p. 165-172
 Wehenkel, Henri, Die Kommunistische Partei Luxemburgs. Aufstieg und Fall einer Partei in: Moreau, Patrick/Marc Lazar/Gerhard Hirscher (eds.),Der Kommunismus in Westeuropa, Niedergang oder Mutation?, Landsberg/Lech, 1998, p. 477-497
 Wehenkel, Henri/ Foetz, Guy/Hoffmann, André, 1921-1981. Beiträge zur Geschichte der Kommunistischen Partei Luxemburgs, Luxembourg 1981
 Wehenkel, Henri/Redondo, Jean-Laurent/Hoffmann, André/Urbany, Serge, Table ronde: PCL et/ou nouvelle gauche: renouvellement et/ou scission, in: Cahiers Marxistes, No. 201, April–May 1996, p. 121-144

External links 
 
 Zeitung vum Lëtzebuerger Vollek, newspaper aligned with the Communist Party of Luxembourg

Political parties in Luxembourg
Luxembourg
Communist Party of Luxembourg
Political parties established in 1921
1921 establishments in Luxembourg
International Meeting of Communist and Workers Parties